Sunil Prasad is an Indian film director and writer.

Born in Siwan, Bihar, Sunil Prasad was a bright student. He would regularly direct plays in school and college.

Filmography

References

External links

1956 births
Living people
Film directors from Bihar
Indian male screenwriters
Screenwriters from Bihar
People from Siwan, Bihar
Hindi screenwriters